Nicolas Flamel (1330 – 22 March 1418) was a French scribe and manuscript seller. After his death, Flamel developed a reputation as an alchemist believed to have created and discovered the philosopher's stone and to have thereby achieved immortality. These legendary accounts first appeared in the 17th century.

According to texts ascribed to Flamel almost 200 years after his death, he had learned alchemical secrets from a Jewish converso on the road to Santiago de Compostela. He has since appeared as a legendary alchemist in various fictional works.

Life

The historical Flamel lived in Paris in the 14th and 15th centuries, and his life is one of the best documented in the history of medieval alchemy. He ran two shops as a scribe and married Perenelle in 1368.  She brought the wealth of two previous husbands to the marriage. The French Catholic couple owned several properties and contributed financially to churches, sometimes by commissioning sculptures. Later in life, they were noted for their wealth and philanthropy.

Flamel lived into his 70s, and in 1410 designed his own tombstone, which was carved with the images of Christ, St. Peter, and St. Paul. The tombstone is preserved at the Musée de Cluny in Paris. Records show that Flamel died in 1418.  He was buried in Paris at the end of the nave of the former Church of Saint-Jacques-de-la-Boucherie. His will, dated 22 November 1416, indicates that he was generous but that he did not have the extraordinary wealth of later alchemical legend. There is no indication that the real Flamel of history was involved in alchemy, pharmacy or medicine.

House in Paris
One of Flamel's houses still stands in Paris, at 51 rue de Montmorency. It is the oldest stone house in the city. There is an old inscription on the wall, which states, "We, plowmen and women living at the porch of this house, built in 1407, are requested to say every day an 'Our Father' and an 'Ave Maria' praying God that His grace forgive poor and dead sinners." As of 2008, the ground floor housed a restaurant. A Paris street near the Louvre Museum, the rue Nicolas Flamel, has been named after him; it intersects with the rue Pernelle, named after his wife.

Posthumous reputation as an alchemist

Legendary accounts of Flamel's life are based on 17th-century works, primarily Livre des figures hiéroglyphiques. The essence of his reputation are claims that he succeeded at the two goals of alchemy: that he made the philosopher's stone, which turns base metals into gold, and that he and his wife, Perenelle, achieved immortality through the "Elixir of Life".

An alchemical book, published in Paris in 1612 as Livre des figures hiéroglyphiques and in London in 1624 as Exposition of the Hieroglyphical Figures was attributed to Flamel. It is a collection of designs purportedly commissioned by Flamel for a tympanum at the Cimetière des Innocents in Paris, long disappeared at the time the work was published. In the publisher's introduction, Flamel's search for the philosopher's stone was described. According to that introduction, Flamel had made it his life's work to understand the text of a mysterious 21-page book he had purchased in 1357, at the cost of two florins. The introduction claims that, around 1378, he traveled to Spain for assistance with translation. On the way back, he reported that he met a sage, who identified Flamel's book as being a copy of the original Book of Abramelin the Mage. With this knowledge, over the next few years, Flamel and his wife allegedly decoded enough of the book to successfully replicate its recipe for the philosopher's stone, producing first silver in 1382 and then gold. Also, Flamel is said to have studied some texts in Hebrew.

The validity of this story was first questioned in 1761 by Etienne Villain. He claimed that the source of  the Flamel legend was P. Arnauld de la Chevalerie, publisher of Exposition of the Hieroglyphical Figures, who wrote the book under the pseudonym Eiranaeus Orandus. Other writers have defended the legendary account of Flamel's life, which has been embellished by stories of sightings in the 17th and 18th centuries and expanded in fictitious works ever since.

Flamel had achieved legendary status within the circles of alchemy by the mid 17th century, with references in Isaac Newton's journals to "the Caduceus, the Dragons of Flammel". Interest in Flamel revived in the 19th century: Victor Hugo mentioned him in The Hunchback of Notre Dame, Erik Satie was intrigued by Flamel, and Albert Pike refers to Nicholas Flamel in his book Morals and Dogma of the Scottish Rite of Freemasonry. Flamel's reputation as an alchemist was further bolstered in the late 20th century by his depiction as the creator of the titular alchemical substance in the best-selling novel Harry Potter and the Philosopher's Stone and its film adaptation. He also appears in the 2018 spinoff film Fantastic Beasts: The Crimes of Grindelwald, where he is portrayed by Brontis Jodorowsky.

Works ascribed to Flamel

 Le Livre des figures hiéroglyphiques (The Book of hieroglyphic figures), first published in Trois traictez de la philosophie naturelle, Paris, Veuve Guillemot, 1612
 Le sommaire philosophique (The Philosophical summary), first published in De la transformation métallique, Paris, Guillaume Guillard, 1561
 Le Livre des laveures (The Book of washing), manuscript BnF MS. Français 19978
 Le Bréviaire de Flamel (Flamel's breviary), manuscript BnF MS. Français 14765

In popular culture

 Flamel has been portrayed in popular fiction as a legendary figure who holds the key to immortality or the philosopher's stone. For example, in Victor Hugo's 1831 novel Notre Dame de Paris, the tragic main character Claude Frollo is a young priest and alchemist who spends much of his time studying the carvings in Les Innocents, trying to fathom Flamel's secrets. Into the twentieth and twenty-first centuries, works such as Harry Potter (1997 to the 2018 spinoff film),  Fullmetal Alchemist (2001–2010), The Secrets of the Immortal Nicholas Flamel (2007–2012), and As Above, So Below (2014) have propagated the legend of Nicolas Flamel.
 The works of Nicolas Flamel are central to several missions found in the 2014 video game Assassins Creed: Unity.

Notes

References
 Decoding the Past: The Real Sorcerer's Stone, November 15, 2006, History Channel video documentary
 The Philosopher's Stone: A Quest for the Secrets of Alchemy, 2001, Peter Marshall, 
 Creations of Fire, Cathy Cobb & Harold Goldwhite, 2002, 
 , Nicolas Flamel- des livres et de l'or, Éditions Imago, 1993, 
 
Secrets of the Immortal Nicholas Flamel.  The Alchemyst, The Magician, The Sorceress, The Necromancer, The Warlock, and The Enchantress

See Also
List of alchemists

External links
 The Alchemy Web Site, alchemical writings ascribed to Flamel.

1330 births
1418 deaths
14th-century French people
15th-century French people
French alchemists
French booksellers
French folklore
Longevity myths
Medieval European scribes
People from Pontoise
14th-century alchemists
15th-century alchemists